Steven "Afterburner" Turner (born January 18, 1987 in Brampton, Ontario) is a professional Canadian football running back and slotback who is currently a free agent. He was drafted 30th overall by the Toronto Argonauts in the 2010 CFL Draft. He played college football for the Bishop's Gaiters.

College career
Turner attended Bishop's University where he played college football for the Bishop's Gaiters from 2006-2009 under former Toronto Argonaut Leroy Blugh.

Professional career

CFL Draft
Turner turned heads at the CFL Evaluation Camp after he broke the E-Camp record of 4.39 seconds for the 40-yard dash by recording his own mark of 4.31 seconds. The previous record had been set by former teammate Jamall Lee at the previous year's E-Camp. Turner finished in first or at least tied for first in the 40-yard dash, the shuttle, the vertical leap and the standing broad leap After his impressive performance at the E-Camp, he was ranked as the 14th best player available in the 2010 CFL Draft in the Canadian Football League’s Amateur Scouting Bureau rankings. On May 2, 2010, Turner was selected with the 30th overall pick by the Toronto Argonauts in the 2010 CFL Draft.

Toronto Argonauts
Turner signed through the 2012 season with the Argonauts on May 21, 2010. On June 7, 2010, Turner ruptured his left Achilles tendon during training camp, leaving his 2010 CFL season debut in doubt. On June 24, 2010, Turner was released by the Argonauts.

On December 7, 2010, Turner was re-signed by the Toronto Argonauts. He was released by the Argonauts on June 8, 2011.

References

1987 births
Living people
Bishop's Gaiters football players
Canadian football wide receivers
Toronto Argonauts players
People from Brampton